Windows on ARM may refer to:
 Windows RT, a deprecated ARM32 version of Windows 8/8.1
 Windows 10 on ARM, Windows 10 compiled for ARM devices
 Windows 11 on ARM, Windows 11 compiled for ARM64 devices